Fredrik Kempe (born 29 April 1972) is a Swedish songwriter and opera and pop singer, who was born in Vårgårda. He has participated in Swedish versions of the musicals Les Misérables and Chess. In 2002, Kempe had a hit with Vincerò, where he mixed opera and Euro disco. He was a jury member in Idol 2016 which was broadcast on TV4.

Melodifestivalen 
Kempe has participated in Melodifestivalen twice as a performer. He entered Melodifestivalen 2004 with the song "Finally", a tribute to his favourite composer Benny Andersson and in 2005 together with Sanna Nielsen singing Du och jag mot världen.

In Melodifestivalen 2007, he co-wrote three songs. One was "Cara Mia", performed by Måns Zelmerlöw and another was "Vågar du, vågar jag", performed by Sanna Nielsen. In Melodifestivalen 2008 he co-wrote the music and wrote the lyrics to the winning entry, "Hero", performed by Charlotte Perrelli. Once again in 2009, he wrote the music and lyrics for the winning song "La voix" performed by Malena Ernman. In 2011 he won Melodifestivalen for the third time, writing the Eric Saade entry "Popular". in 2014 he won Melodifestivalen for a fourth time, writing Sanna Nielsen's entry "Undo".

Entries

Melodi Grand Prix 
In 2010 he composed and co-wrote the Norwegian entry, "My Heart Is Yours", for the Eurovision Song Contest 2010, performed by Didrik Solli-Tangen.

Discography 
Bohème (2004-04-21)
Songs For Your Broken Heart (2002-12-02)

References

External links 

Svensktoppen
1972 births
Living people
Swedish songwriters
Swedish tenors
21st-century Swedish singers
21st-century Swedish male singers
Melodifestivalen contestants of 2005
Melodifestivalen contestants of 2004